Portimonense Sporting Clube is a futsal team based in the city of Portimão, Portugal, that plays in the Portuguese Futsal First Division. It is a part of the Portimonense sports club. In 2019 Portimonense won the South Zone series of the Portuguese II Divisão Futsal achieving the promotion to the first tier Liga Sport Zone for the first time in its history, and becoming the first team from the Algarve to play in the competition.

Current squad

References

External links
 Official Website
 Zerozero

Futsal clubs in Portugal